The 6L50 (and similar 6L45) is a 6-speed longitudinally-mounted automatic transmission produced by General Motors. It is very similar in design to the larger 6L80/6L90, and is produced at GM Powertrain plants in Toledo, Ohio; Silao, Guanajuato, Mexico; and by the independent Punch Powerglide company in Strasbourg, France. This transmission features clutch to clutch shifting, eliminating the bands used on older transmission designs. The 6L50 debuted for the 2007 model year on the V8-powered versions of the Cadillac STS sedan and Cadillac SRX crossover, and replaces the 5L40-E and 5L50 in GM's lineup. The 6L45 version is used in certain BMW vehicles and the Cadillac ATS, as part of either rear-wheel drive and all-wheel drive powertrains.

The 6L50 is adaptable to rear-wheel drive and all-wheel drive applications.

Specifications

Technical data

Maximum engine power: 	

Maximum engine torque: 	m)

Maximum gearbox torque: 	m)

First: 	4.060

Second: 	2.370

Third: 	1.550

Fourth: 	1.160

Fifth: 	0.850

Sixth: 	0.670
Reverse: 	3.200

Maximum shift speed: 	7000 rpm

Maximum Validated Weight (GVW): 	
Maximum Validated Weight (GCVW): 	

7-position quadrant: 	P, R, N, D, X, X, X (X = available calibratable range position)

Case material: 	Die cast aluminum

Shift pattern: 	(2) Three-way on/off solenoids

Shift quality: 	Five variable bleed solenoid

Torque converter clutch: 	Variable Bleed Solenoid ECCC

Converter size: 	240 mm, 258 mm

Fluid type: 	DEXRON VI

Fluid capacity with 258 & 300 mm converter: 	9.1 kg

Available Control Features

Multiple Shift Patterns (Selectable)

Driver Shift Control (Tap Up / Tap Down)

Enhanced Performance Algorithm Shifting (PAS)

Selectable Tow / Haul Mode

Engine Torque Management On All Shifts

Altitude and Temperature Compensation

Adaptive Shift Time

Neutral Idle

Reverse Lockout

Automatic Grade Braking

Additional Features

OBDII / EOBD

Integral Electro/Hydraulic Controls Module (Tehcm)

Control Interface Protocol – GMLAN

The transmission control module (TCM) is built into the solenoid pack/housing.

Assembly sites: 	GMPT Strasbourg, France; GMPT Toledo, Ohio, USA; GMPT Silao, Mexico

Applications

6L45
 2007–2010 : BMW X3 - 3.0si / 2.5si / 3.0i
 2007–2013: BMW 3 series - 330(x)i / 328(x)i / 325(x)i / 323i / 320i / 318i / 316i
 2007–2019: BMW 1 series - 130i / 128i / 125i / 120i / 118i / 116i
 2009–2015: BMW X1 (E84) - 2.8i xDrive / 2.5i xDrive / 1.8i sDrive
 2013–2015 : Cadillac ATS
 2010–2013 : Cadillac SLS
 2012–2017 : Chevrolet Caprice PPV V6
 2011-2013: Holden VE Commodore, Calais, SV6
 2013-2017: Holden VF Commodore, Calais, SV6

6L50
 2007–2011 : Cadillac SLS
 2007–2011 : Cadillac STS
 2007–2009 : Cadillac SRX
 2008–2015 : Cadillac CTS
 2010–2015 : Camaro LS/LT (V6 Models)
 2009–2011: Holden VE Commodore / Holden VE Berlina / Holden VE Calais / Chevrolet Lumina / Chevrolet Omega
 2009–2011: Holden WM Statesman/Caprice / Daewoo Veritas
 2015-2022: Chevrolet Colorado
 2019–present : UAZ Patriot
 2022-on : Bremach

See also 
 List of GM transmissions

References 

6L50